Northia  is a genus of large sea snails, marine gastropod mollusks in the subfamily Photinae of the family Nassariidae.

Species
According to the World Register of Marine Species (WoRMS), the following species with valid names are included within the genus Northia  :
 Northia northiae (Griffith & Pidgeon (ex. Gray MS), 1834)
 Northia pristis (Deshayes, G.P. in Lamarck, J.B.P.A. de, 1844)
Taxon inquirendum
 Northia angulosa Jousseaume, 1898

References

External links
 Gray, J. E. (1847). A list of the genera of recent Mollusca, their synonyma and types. Proceedings of the Zoological Society of London. (1847) 15: 129-219
 Galindo, L. A.; Puillandre, N.; Utge, J.; Lozouet, P.; Bouchet, P. (2016). The phylogeny and systematics of the Nassariidae revisited (Gastropoda, Buccinoidea). Molecular Phylogenetics and Evolution. 99: 337-353

Nassariidae